Gretel Lambert (born Margarethe Bergmann; April 12, 1914 – July 25, 2017) was a German Jewish track and field athlete who competed as a high jumper during the 1930s.

Due to her Jewish origins, the Nazis prevented her from taking part in the 1936 Summer Olympics, after which she left Germany and vowed never to return. She however visited Germany in 2004 to meet with her 1930s rival Elfriede Kaun, whom she considered a friend. Bergmann turned 100 in 2014. She died in 2017 at her home in Jamaica Estates, Queens, New York.

Life and career
Margarethe Bergmann was born in 1914 in Laupheim, Germany, the daughter of Edwin and Paula (née Stern) Bergmann, a businessman.

She later began her career in athletics in Laupheim. In 1930 she joined Ulmer FV 1894, winning her first title in high jumping in 1931 when, during the South German Championships, she jumped 1.51 metres. She won that same title again in 1932. After the Nazis' accession to power on 30 January 1933 she was expelled from the club for being Jewish. That April her parents sent her to the United Kingdom where in 1934 she took part in the British Championships and won the high jump with a height of 1.55 metres.

The German government wanted her to return to Germany to help portray the nation as unbiased in its Olympic-team selections. Members of her family, who had stayed behind, were threatened with reprisals if she did not return. She complied and returned to Germany, where she was allowed to prepare for the 1936 Olympic Games. She won the Württembergian Championships in the high jump in 1935 and again on 30 June 1936 when, one month prior to the opening of the Olympic Games, she tied the German record by crossing 1.60 metres.

Bergmann-Lambert was banned from the Berlin Olympics despite matching the high-jump record of 1.60 metres (5 feet 3 inches) to qualify and having spent two years on the team, starting in 1934. However, two weeks before the opening of the Olympics, she received a letter from the German sports authorities that she was being removed from the national team for under-performance. She was not replaced; instead, Germany fielded only two high jumpers: Dora Ratjen, who was later revealed to be a man who had been raised as a girl, and Elfriede Kaun. Bergmann's accomplishment was stricken from the record books some weeks later.

In 1937, Bergmann emigrated to the United States, settling in New York City, where she married Bruno Lambert, a physician. That year, she won the U.S. women's high jump and shot put championships, and in 1938 she again won the high jump. Her sports career ended after the entry of the United States into World War II. In 1942, she received United States citizenship.

Awards and recognition

Bergmann's entry into the Jewish Hall of Fame at Wingate Institute in Israel in 1980 revived interest in her story.

In August 1995 a sports complex in Berlin-Wilmersdorf was named after her on the recommendation of the German National Sports Federation. Bergmann, who had vowed never to set foot on German soil again, did not attend the festivities. In 1996 she was admitted to the National Jewish Sports Hall of Fame in the United States.

The stadium in Laupheim, from which she had been barred in the 1930s, was named after her in 1999. This time Bergmann attended the dedication, saying:

Bergmann added, "I ... finally came to the conclusion that people now had nothing to do with it". In 2004, a documentary based on her life in Germany, Hitler's Pawn – The Margaret Lambert Story, mostly focusing on her athletic life, debuted on HBO prior to the 2004 Summer Olympics.

On 23 November 2009 her German national record (1.60m) from 1936 was officially restored by the German track and field association, which also requested she be admitted to the German sports hall of fame. In September 2009 Berlin 36, a film about her preparation for, and exclusion from, the 1936 Olympics, debuted in German theaters.

Honors
In August 2014, one of the streets in the Olympic Park Berlin (former Reichssportfeld) was renamed "Gretel-Bergmann-Weg" in her honor.

See also
1936 Summer Olympics
List of Jewish American sportspeople
List of Jews in sports
History of the Jews in Laupheim
List of centenarians (sportspeople)

References

Further reading
 
 

 Gretel Bergmann: "Ich war die große jüdische Hoffnung". Erinnerungen einer außergewöhnlichen Sportlerin. Hrsg. v. Haus der Geschichte Baden-Württemberg. Übersetzt aus dem Englischen von Irmgard Hölscher. 2. erweiterte Auflage, Verlag Regionalkultur, 2015; .
 Berno Bahro, Jutta Braun: Berlin '36: Die unglaubliche Geschichte einer jüdischen Sportlerin im "Dritten Reich". Berlin 2009; .
 Berno Bahro, Jutta Braun, Hans Joachim Teichler (Hrsg.): Vergessene Rekorde. Jüdische Leichtathletinnen vor und nach 1933. Verlag für Berlin-Brandenburg, Berlin 2010, .
 
 Klaus Brinkbäumer: „Ich wollte zeigen, dass ein jüdisches Mädchen die Deutschen besiegen kann.“ auf: Spiegel online (interview), August 25, 2009 
 Christian Frietsch: Hitlers Angst vor dem jüdischen Gold. Der Fall Bergmann, die verhinderte Olympiasiegerin. Nomos, Baden-Baden 2013; .

In film
 Die Angst sprang mit — Die jüdische Hochspringerin Gretel Bergmann (SWR, 2004 (TV documentary), Inhaltsangabe)
 Hitler's Pawn — The Margaret Lambert Story. imdb.com; accessed September 10, 2017.
 Berlin 36 — Die wahre Geschichte einer Siegerin. (Germany 2009), directed by Kaspar Heidelbach, Bergmann was portrayed by Karoline Herfurth
 Der Traum von Olympia — Die Nazispiele von 1936 (ARD, 2016, television docudrama, Inhaltsangabe), Bergmann was portrayed by Sandra von Ruffin.

External links
 Voices on Antisemitism Interview with Margaret Lambert from the United States Holocaust Memorial Museum
 Gretel Bergmann webpage, jewsinsports.org
 Gretel Bergmann infosite, jewishsports.net
 Profile, Jewish Women's Archive (jwa.org)
 "From Nazi pawn to U.S. champion", Los Angeles Times

1914 births
2017 deaths
German centenarians
Jewish female athletes (track and field)
Jewish American sportspeople
American female high jumpers
German female high jumpers
Jewish emigrants from Nazi Germany to the United States
People from Laupheim
Sportspeople from Tübingen (region)
People with acquired American citizenship
International Jewish Sports Hall of Fame inductees
American centenarians
Women centenarians
People from Jamaica Estates, Queens
20th-century German women
21st-century American Jews
20th-century American women
21st-century American women
German Ashkenazi Jews